Cyclone Prairie Rangers is a 1944 American Western film directed by Benjamin H. Kline and written by Elizabeth Beecher. The film stars Charles Starrett, Dub Taylor, Constance Worth, Jimmie Davis and Jimmy Wakely. The film was released on November 9, 1944, by Columbia Pictures.

Plot

Cast           
Charles Starrett as Steve Travis
Dub Taylor as Cannonball
Constance Worth as Lola
Jimmie Davis as Jimmie Davis
Jimmy Wakely as Jimmy Wakely 
Robert Fiske as Emil Weber
Clancy Cooper as Henry Vogel
Ray Bennett as Sheriff Morgan
I. Stanford Jolley as Smoke Ellis
Eddie Phillips as Tony Johnson
Edmund Cobb as Clem Dunphy
Forrest Taylor as Lee Bennett
Paul Conrad as Jim Leonard
John Tyrrell as Doc Pearson
Edna Harris as Waitress
Steve Clark as Dana

References

External links
 

1944 films
1940s English-language films
American Western (genre) films
1944 Western (genre) films
Columbia Pictures films
American black-and-white films
1940s American films